Wa country may refer to:
Wa States, the country of the Wa people
Wa (Japan), the oldest recorded name of Japan